The Powerpuff Girls: Chemical X-Traction is a single-player fighting video game for the Nintendo 64 and PlayStation released in 2001 and based on the Cartoon Network animated series The Powerpuff Girls. In the game, the player controls one of the three Powerpuff Girls in a variety of one-on-one melee battles against the computer-controlled villains.

Gameplay
The Powerpuff Girls must battle enemies in a variety of settings in order to reclaim Chemical X and track down Mojo Jojo. Players can choose from ten playable characters, which consist of the three Powerpuff Girls and seven villains (Ace, Big Billy, Fuzzy Lumpkins, HIM, Mojo Jojo, Princess Morbucks, and Sedusa).

In the story mode, players can pick up objects and throw them at an enemy to decrease their opponents health meter. They can use superpowered attacks by collecting vials of Chemical X. For the PlayStation edition, all three Powerpuff Girls were given an additional special move. If the player successfully defeats the enemy in two out of three rounds, they move to the next enemy location. The gameplay is very similar to the popular Capcom fighting game, Power Stone.

Players can play the story mode or can battle against a friend in a head-to-head battle.

In Simulator Mode, people can fight as a Powerpuff against a villain or a villain against another villain.

Plot
The Powerpuff Girls were making a delicious pie while Bubbles decided to add in Chemical X as an ingredient for the pie. Once they baked the pie, Mojo Jojo took the pie and shared it with his allies including Fuzzy Lumpkins, Big Billy, Ace, Sedusa and Princess Morbucks. The Powerpuff Girls eventually defeat Mojo Jojo but were surprised by HIM's sudden arrival so the fiend can use the Chemical X for himself. The girls defeated HIM and put the Chemical X back where it belongs.

Reception

The PlayStation version received "unfavorable" reviews according to the review aggregation website Metacritic.

References

External links

 
 

2001 video games
3D fighting games
Asylum Entertainment games
Cartoon Network video games
Fighting games
Multiplayer and single-player video games
Nintendo 64 games
PlayStation (console) games
The Powerpuff Girls video games
Superhero video games
Video games developed in the United Kingdom
VIS Entertainment games